Hopewell Heights (also, Hopewell) is a location in the city of Toledo in Lucas County, Ohio, United States.

References

Neighborhoods in Toledo, Ohio